Laure-Therese Cros (December 22, 1856, Paris, France – May 12, 1916, Issy-les-Moulineaux, France) was a pretender to the throne of Kingdom of Araucanía and Patagonia.

Early life 
Born December 22, 1856, in Paris, France, to Antoine-Hippolyte Cros and Leonilda Mendès e Texeira.  She married Louis Marie Bernard on November 14, 1877, and was the mother to three sons: Etienne Bernard, Jacques Antoine Bernard who succeeded her as the sovereign of Araucania, and Andre Bernard.  Laure-Therese was the niece of 
Charles Cros poet and inventor, and Henry Cros (:fr: Henry Cros), the French poet, painter and sculptor.  Her Uncle Henry created a medallion showing the young Laure-Therese.  She died February 12, 1916, in Issy-les-Moulineaux, France.

Pretender to the throne of Araucanía and Patagonia 
On August 28, 1873, the Criminal Court of Paris ruled that Antoine de Tounens, first "king of Araucania and Patagonia" did not justify his status of sovereign.

Since the death of Antoine de Tounens, some French citizens without familial relations declared themselves to be pretenders to the throne of Araucania and Patagonia. Whether the Mapuche themselves accept this, or are even aware of it, is unclear.

The pretenders to the throne of Araucania and Patagonia are called monarchs and sovereigns of fantasy, "having only fanciful claims to a kingdom without legal existence and having no international recognition".

On November 1, 1903, she succeeded to his father Antoine-Hippolyte Cros as pretender to the throne of Araucania and Patagonia.

Honours 
In 1958 Philippe Boiry, pretender to the throne from 1952 to 2014, created a medal of the l'Ordre de la reine Laure-Thérèse in memory of Laure-Thérèse Cros.

References

External links 
Royal House of Araucania and Patagonia
North American Araucanian Royalist Society
Mapuche International Link

Araucania
Kings of Araucania
1856 births
1903 deaths